{{Infobox person
| honorific_prefix   = 
| name               =  Gita Pullapilly
| honorific_suffix   = 
| image              =  
| alt                = 
| caption            = 
| native_name        = 
| native_name_lang   = Hindi
| pronunciation      = 
| birth_name         =  
| birth_date         =  
| birth_place        = South Bend, Indiana, U.S.
| baptised           =  
| disappeared_date   =  
| disappeared_place  = 
| disappeared_status = 
| death_date         =  
| death_place        = 
| death_cause        = 
| body_discovered    = 
| resting_place      = 
| resting_place_coordinates =  
| burial_place       =  
| burial_coordinates =  
| monuments          = 
| nationality        = Indian-American
| other_names        = 
| citizenship        = American
| education          = B.B.A. (Finance) M.A. (Journalism) 
| alma_mater         = University of Notre Dame Medill School of Journalism, Northwestern University
| occupation         = Screenwriter film producer director television journalist
| years_active       = 2007–present
| era                = 21st Century
| employer           = Entrepreneur 
| organization       = Team A + G, Inc.
| agent              =  
| known_for          = The Way We Get ByBeneath the Harvest SkyQueenpins
| notable_works      =  Crook County Beneath the Harvest Sky The Way We Get By Queenpins  Inspiration To Get You Through A F*cked Up Year
| style              = 
| height             =  
| television         = Frontline/World P.O.V. Lifecasters''' 
| title              = Filmmaker
| movement           = 
| criminal_charge    =  
| criminal_penalty   = 
| criminal_status    = 
| spouse             =  Aron Gaudet
| partner            =  
| children           = 
| parents            =  
| mother             =  Elizabeth Pullapilly
| father             =  Cyriac Pullapilly
| relatives          = Kavita Pullapilly (sister) Anand Pullapilly (brother) Joan Gaudet (mother-in-law)
| callsign           = 
| awards             = Fulbright Scholarship Variety magazine's "10 Directors To Watch" with filmmaker, Aron Gaudet, for 2014 Euphoria Calvin Klein Spotlight on Women Filmmakers Live the Dream Grant at the Gotham Awards Independent Magazines "Filmmakers to Watch" With Aron Gaudet, jointly appointed Guggenheim Fellows Rev. Anthony J. Lauck Award by the University of Notre Dame 2019 Presidential Leadership Scholar 
| website            = 
| signature          = 
| signature_size     = 
| signature_alt      = 
}}Gita Pullapilly' is a Hollywood film and television director, screenwriter, producer, and author. She writes and directs with her husband and film partner, Aron Gaudet under their banner, "Team A + G, Inc."

Life and career

Gita Pullapilly co-writes and directs with her husband, Aron Gaudet. Together, they work on comedies and dramas.

Gita Pullapilly was born in South Bend, Indiana. She studied finance at University of Notre Dame, receiving her B.B.A. and received her M.A. in journalism at the Medill School of Journalism, Northwestern University. She was awarded a Fulbright Scholarship in 2005. She was chosen as the first filmmaker to become a Fulbright Senior Scholar to Jordan. Pullapilly is a Presidential Leadership Scholar. She has family in Kerala and Belgaum, India.

In 2007, Pullapilly was selected as a WGBH Filmmaker-in-Residence.

Pullapilly met and worked with Aron Gaudet on their documentary, The Way We Get By, for five years prior to marrying him in 2009. Their wedding was profiled in the New York Times.The Way We Get By was awarded "Best Documentary" in the AARP's "Movies For Grownups" Awards of 2009. The film had its world premiere at the South by Southwest Film Festival, (SXSW), won 18 festival awards around the world, played theatrically in over 60 cities across the U.S. and aired on the critically acclaimed, independent television series P.O.V. on PBS as a prime time special. That year, she was selected as one of Independent Magazine's "Filmmakers to Watch." It was released in US cinemas in July 2009 and has twice been aired by PBS television, in 2009 and 2010. Gaudet and Pullapilly were invited to the White House in 2009 with the three subjects of the film, Joan Gaudet, Bill Knight, and Jerry Mundy. The Way We Get By was nominated for a News and Documentary Emmy Awards in 2010.

In 2012, Pullapilly was one of the creators and executive producers on the national United States PBS program, Lifecasters, which had its world premiere at the Film Society of Lincoln Center. Pullapilly has received a number of grants for her projects including from ITVS, CPB, POV, MacArthur Foundation, and Fledgling Fund.

Pullapilly and Gaudet wrote, produced and directed a film entitled Beneath The Harvest Sky (formerly called Blue Potato), which was also produced with her sister, Kavita Pullapilly. The film had its world premiere at the Toronto International Film Festival and was acquired by Tribeca Films.

Pullapilly was selected as one of Variety's "10 Directors To Watch" with filmmaker, Aron Gaudet, for 2014 and won the "Euphoria Calvin Klein Spotlight on Women Filmmakers Live the Dream Grant" at the Gotham Awards.

In 2015, Pullapilly and her writing partner, Aron Gaudet were jointly appointed Guggenheim Fellows to support their current movie project, titled Crook County''. In December 2015, Pullapilly and Aron Gaudet were recognized on the 2015 Black List for having one of the best unproduced screenplays of that year for "Crook County".

In January 2016, the University of Notre Dame Alumni Board awarded Pullapilly the Rev. Anthony J. Lauck Award, which is given to a graduate for outstanding accomplishments or achievements as a practicing artist.

In 2018, Pullapilly and her film partner, Aron Gaudet, were mentees in the Half Initiative, shadowing on the FX television series, American Horror Story. Ryan Murphy launched Half aiming to make Hollywood more inclusive by creating equal opportunities for women and minorities behind the camera.

In 2019, Pullapilly and Gaudet launched the India- US Film Initiative. The goal is to bring Hollywood and Bollywood filmmakers together to share best practices, ways to increase opportunities for talented storytellers, and innovative techniques for quality filmmaking. 

Pullapilly and Gaudet are known for their innovative "servant leadership" model in their directing that has garnered positive media attention and exposure. Their innovative model and leadership techniques are being adapted for film and television productions around the world. 

In 2020, Pullapilly and Gaudet directed their feature comedy, Queenpins, starring Kristen Bell, Kirby Howell Baptiste, Vince Vaughn, and Paul Walter Hauser. In 2022, they directed their film, "David Armstrong," that 101 Studios produced starring Jeremy Renner and Billy Bob Thornton. In 2022, Pullapilly and Gaudet wrote their first book, "Inspiration To Get You Through a F*cked Up Year."

References

External links

Living people
People from South Bend, Indiana
University of Notre Dame alumni
Medill School of Journalism alumni
American documentary film producers
American women screenwriters
American documentary film directors
1977 births
Film directors from Indiana
21st-century American women
American women documentary filmmakers